Bubble Guppies is a CGI-animated children's television series produced for Nickelodeon and created by Jonny Belt and Robert Scull. The series is a combination of the sketch comedy, edutainment, and musical genres, and revolves around the underwater adventures of a group of merperson preschoolers named Molly, Gil, Goby, Deema, Oona, Nonny, and Zooli. The program premiered on Nickelodeon on January 24, 2011, and originally ran for four seasons until its conclusion on October 21, 2016. The series is produced using 3D software.

Almost three years after the last episode of its original run, it was revived for a fifth season on June 4, 2019 with an order of 26 episodes. The fifth season premiered on September 27, 2019. On February 19, 2020, the show was renewed for a sixth season, which premiered on October 19, 2021.

Format

Season 1-4 Format
All episodes follow a similar format. The episode starts with the show logo in a room and it is filling with water. Then the Little Fish breaks the fourth wall by saying the title of the show to the audience. The series starts with an introduction by Molly, saying 'Hi, it's me, Molly, and it's time for—' only to be stopped by Gil performing an act related to the episode's subject. One or both of the two then state 'It's time for Bubble Guppies!', and the theme song plays. After the theme song, the Little Fish say the episode's name.

An event may occur when one or more characters is on the way to school. For example, Avi breaks his tail in "Call a Clambulance!" when Oona is on the way to school. A guppy tells Mr. Grouper about the earlier experience. He suggests, "Let's think about it", and the characters discuss the theme. A song follows, focusing on the episode's main theme. Usually, Molly or Gil sing this song, but there are episodes where Deema or Mr. Grouper sing it instead.

One of the guppies may go to a shop that mostly focuses on the theme (example: a doctor's office in "Call a Clambulance!"). The owner of the shop (usually played by Deema) will ask questions about what they need. Jokes and silly responses will eventually lead to the correct necessity. Mr. Grouper often ends this segment by asking, "Excuse me, what time is it?" in a call and response pattern, with the guppies responding, "It's time for lunch!" three times.

At lunch, three of the characters make a food pun about the subject of the episode; usually done by Nonny. After lunch, another Gil and Molly sketch is shown.

After the sketch, some classroom activity is shown further reinforcing that episode's topic, or Mr. Grouper talks more about the theme. This is usually ended when Mr. Grouper says, "Line up everybody, it's time to go outside!" followed by the "outside song". Outside the classroom, the guppies act out a story about the theme, interfused with Adobe Flash-animated graphics. Once back inside, a second song is typically performed. Afterward, Gil and Molly do another sketch.

The guppies may go on a field trip that focuses on the theme.
They yell out, "FIELD TRIP!" This may focus on a problem shown earlier and involves the key characters. The episode concludes with a final sketch by Gil and Molly, followed by a shorter version of the theme song. The credits then roll which include a song played earlier in that episode.

Season 5-6 Format
Season 5 introduced a new series format which keeps the initial format, but this time has the story segment take up the majority of the episode, and incorporates the shop and lunch segments into the narrative (basically with the new structure, which was first introduced in Season 5, the store and meal parts are now integrated into the story and the story section takes up the bulk of the show). Gil and Molly simply introduce themselves before the theme song with no opening gag, the show cuts right to school after the theme, and the dance songs and field trips were removed. With the exception of select special episodes, Mr. Grouper's presence was primarily reduced to the beginning class segments. Gil and Molly's sketches were removed as well, instead having Mr. Grouper wave goodbye to the viewer as the guppies go back inside.

Two-Level Humor Track
A significant contribution to the show's popularity is its two-level humor track. Minor characters include a police officer named Miranda and a winged serpent named Pretzel-coatl. Heavy metal singer Ozzy Osbourne guest starred as Sid Fishy in the 2015 episode "Super Guppies!", while actor George Takei guest starred in a sci-fi mashup which pitted him as a Darth Vader-like armored villain against starship captain Gil and his first officer, Mr. Smart (Nonny). Recurring character Mr. Grumpfish is a reference to Monty Python's The Meaning of Life, while the episode "The Puppy and the Ring" makes in-jokes ranging from J. R. R. Tolkien to L. Frank Baum.

Characters
Molly - A bubbly human guppy girl. She is the host of the show (along with Gil) and Gil’s best friend. Molly appears alongside Gil in the transitional segments, where she aids Gil in hopes that problems won't arise. Brianna Gentilella provides her singing voice in all seasons and her speaking voice in seasons 1–2 and season 6 episodes 2-13 and from episode 15. Her speaking voice is provided by Bailey Gambertoglio in seasons 3–4 and Taylor Kaplan in season 5-6.
Gil - A silly human guppy boy. He is the host of the show (along with Molly) and Molly’s best friend. Gil gets scared easily, and appears alongside Molly in the transitional segments. In those segments, he often attempts to do something but with unexpected results. He is voiced by Zachary Gordon in season 1–season 2 episode 2, Jacob Bertrand in season 2 episode 3–season 3, Jay Gragnani in season 4, and Quinn Breslin in seasons 5–6. His singing voice is provided by Teddy Walsh in season 2 episode 4–season 3, Nirvaan Pal in season 5 and Brody Bett in season 6.
Goby - A human guppy boy with an imaginative personality. He is voiced by Jelani Imani in seasons 1–2, Marleik "Mar Mar" Walker in season 3, Issac Ryan Brown in season 4, Caleb Clark in season 5 episodes 1–24 and Josiah Gaffney in season 5 episode 25–season 6. He is also good friends with Gil. His singing voice is provided by Christopher Borger in season 1 and Johntae Limpscomb in seasons 3–4.
Deema - A human guppy girl with a wild imagination and often plays the role of shopkeeper in the "store" segments. She is voiced by Angelina Wahler in seasons 1–2, Grace Kaufman in seasons 3–4, Catherine Bradley in season 5 and Zoe Glick in season 6. Her singing voice is provided by Selena Gonzalez in season 1.
Oona - A human guppy girl with a sweet personality. She is voiced by Reyna Shaskan in seasons 1–2, Tori Feinstein in seasons 3–4, Colby Kipnes in seasons 5–6, and Mia Lynn Bangunan from season 6 episode 8.
Nonny - A human guppy boy with an intelligent personality. Despite not smiling a lot, he is the most polite and mature member of the group. He is also Oona's best friend. He is smart and helps Deema pronounce words and helps his friends answer their questions. He is voiced by Eamon Pirruccello in seasons 1–2, Jet Jurgensmeyer in seasons 3–4, and AJ Kane in seasons 5–6. His singing voice is provided by Eason Rytter in season 3.
Zooli - A human guppy girl introduced in season 5. She is an animal expert. She is voiced by Leah Janvier.
Bubble Puppy - Gil's pet puppy and best friend. He has orange and white fur and a green collar with a yellow fish license. He is voiced by Frank Welker.
Mr. Grouper - A big orange goldfish and the guppies' teacher. He respects the kids' imaginations, ideas, and suggestions. A prominent feature in seasons 1-4 is that he can also change his natural orange skin into a wide variety of different colors and patterns. He is voiced by Tino Insana from 2011 to 2016 and Fred Tatasciore since 2014. His singing voice is provided by Chris Phillips in seasons 1-4.
Little Fish - A group of small orange goldfish who appear throughout each episode as guides for the viewers. They announce the episode's name and shout out the answers to viewer-response questions, as well as provide commentary in some scenes. They are voiced by Skai Jackson in seasons 1–2, Mia Vavasseur in season 3, Kayla Erickson in season 4, and Jordan Friedman in seasons 5–6.

UK cast
The revived series was not dubbed for UK release, and instead, the original airs. "The Jawsome Sharkventure!", however, used the British voices for the Baby Shark's Big Show! cast.

Molly (voiced by Abriella Bierer in seasons 1–4)
Gil (voiced by Hayden Hunter in seasons 1–3, John Campbell in season 3, and Sam Brown in seasons 3–4)
Oona (voiced by Harriet Perring in seasons 1–2 and Amba Bierer in seasons 3–4)
Deema (voiced by Lauren Reichwald in seasons 1–3 and Megan North in season 4)
Goby (voiced by Lewis Dillon in seasons 1–3 and Edward Cross in seasons 3–4)
Nonny (voiced by Will Matthews in seasons 1–4)

Production
Although it premiered on Nickelodeon in 2011, the show started production in 2009.

The voice cast is based in New York and California and the dialogue is recorded at New York-based Dubway Studios and Rhumba Recorders and Burbank-based Nickelodeon Animation Studio.

In addition to Nickelodeon Animation Studio, outsourced animation was provided by WildBrain Entertainment for Season 1, Nelvana for Season 2-4, and Jam Filled Toronto for Season 5–6.

Broadcast
The series first premiered on January 24, 2011, the second season then premiering on November 4 of the same year. Season 3 premiered on August 12, 2013, with an episode entitled, "Get Ready for School!". Season 4 premiered on May 21, 2015. Season 5 premiered on September 27, 2019. Season 6 premiered on October 19, 2021.

Episodes

DVD releases

References

External links
 
 

2010s American animated television series
2020s American animated television series
2010s Canadian animated television series
2020s Canadian animated television series
2010s Nickelodeon original programming
2020s Nickelodeon original programming
2011 American television series debuts
2011 Canadian television series debuts
American children's animated comedy television series
American children's animated fantasy television series
American children's animated musical television series
American computer-animated television series
American television series revived after cancellation
Canadian children's animated comedy television series
Canadian children's animated fantasy television series
Canadian children's animated musical television series
Canadian computer-animated television series
Children's sketch comedy
English-language television shows
Mermaids in television
Fictional mermen and mermaids
Treehouse TV original programming
Nick Jr. original programming
American preschool education television series
Canadian preschool education television series
Television series by DHX Media
Television series by Nelvana
Animated television series about children
Animated television series about fish